Margarita Corona (1911–1983) was a Brazilian-born Argentine film actress. Corona was born in Rio de Janeiro, but moved as a small child to Argentina. After making her debut in Savage Pampas, she appeared in twenty eight films and television episodes. She was the sister of the actor Juan Corona.

Selected filmography
 Savage Pampas (1945)
 Suburb (1951)
 Emergency Ward (1952)
 The Romance of a Gaucho (1961)
 A Nation With Me (1967)

References

Bibliography 
 Cowie, Peter. World Filmography: 1967. Fairleigh Dickinson Univ Press, 1977.

External links 
 

1911 births
1983 deaths
Argentine film actresses
Argentine stage actresses
Actresses from Rio de Janeiro (city)
20th-century Argentine actresses
Brazilian emigrants to Argentina